Zhonglupu Town is an urban town in Xiangtan County, Hunan Province, People's Republic of China.

Administrative division
The town is divided into 39 villages and one community.

Geography
The region abounds with silicon and limestone.

Zhonglupu Reservoir and Yinzishan Reservoir are located in the town.

Economy
Rice, pig, sugar, lotus seed, tea and black goat are important to the economy.

Education
High school: Xiangtan County Fifth High School.

Attractions
Xiaoxia Mountain and Wulong Mountain are famous tourist attractions.

Culture
Huaguxi is the most influence local theater.

Celebrity
, Revolutionist.

References

External links

Divisions of Xiangtan County